The 2022 season was the 15th season for the Indian Premier League franchise Punjab Kings. They were one of the ten teams to compete in the 2022 Indian Premier League.

Background
The franchise chose to retain two players ahead of the 2022 mega-auction.

Retained Mayank Agarwal, Arshdeep Singh
Released KL Rahul, Chris Gayle, Darshan Nalkande, Harpreet Brar, Mandeep Singh, Mohammad Shami, Murugan Ashwin, Nicholas Pooran, Sarfaraz Khan, Deepak Hooda, Ishan Porel, Ravi Bishnoi, Chris Jordan, Prabhsimran Singh, Dawid Malan, Riley Meredith, Jhye Richardson, Shahrukh Khan, Jalaj Saxena, Moises Henriques, Utkarsh Singh, Fabian Allen, Saurabh Kumar
Acquired at the auction Shikhar Dhawan, Kagiso Rabada, Jonny Bairstow, Rahul Chahar, Shahrukh Khan, Harpreet Brar, Prabhsimran Singh, Jitesh Sharma, Ishan Porel, Liam Livingstone, Odean Smith, Sandeep Sharma, Raj Angad Bawa, Rishi Dhawan, Prerak Mankad, Vaibhav Arora, Writtick Chatterjee, Baltej Dhanda, Ansh Patel, Nathan Ellis, Atharva Taide, Bhanuka Rajapaksa, Benny Howell.

Squad 
 Players with international caps are listed in bold.
Squad strength: 25 (18 - Indian, 7 - overseas)

Administration and support staff

Kit manufacturers and sponsors 

|

Group stage

Points table

Group stage fixtures

References

Cricket teams in India
2022 Indian Premier League
Punjab Kings seasons